Shawn Langdon is a drag racer.  He won the 2013 NHRA Top Fuel championship.

He is a native of Mira Loma, California.

References

External links
Team biography

Living people
Dragster drivers
Racing drivers from California
Sportspeople from Riverside County, California
1982 births